Penicillium paradoxum is a species of fungus in the genus Penicillium. Penicillium paradoxum grows on dog dung and is phototropic, and has a characteristic odour. Unusual for Penicillium, the fungus has an Aspergillus-like conidial head, not a penicillus.

References

paradoxum
Fungi described in 2014